Cecilia Webb (25 March 1888–1957) was a British sculptor.

Biography
Webb was the daughter of the architect Morpeth Webb and was born at Stamford in Lincolnshire. Throughout her career, Webb made sculptures in bronze, clay and plaster and, during the inter-war decades, was a regular exhibitor at the Royal Academy in London, with the Royal Scottish Academy in Edinburgh, at the Royal Glasgow Institute of the Fine Arts and at the Paris Salon. A 1949 ceramic model of the Holy Family by Webb is in Southwell Minster in Nottinghamshire. For the later half of her life, Webb lived at Melton Mowbray, where she died in 1957.

References

1888 births
1957 deaths
20th-century British women artists
20th-century British sculptors
English women sculptors
People from Stamford, Lincolnshire